Tertiary Highway 802, commonly referred to as Highway 802, is a provincially maintained tertiary road in the Canadian province of Ontario, located in Thunder Bay District. The  route branches both north and south from Highway 11 to connect with the community of Kashabowie and the ghost town of Burchell Lake, respectively. The highway was established in 1962 at the peak of operations of the Burchell Lake mine. Although the mine and town were subsequently abandoned in 1966, the highway remains under provincial jurisdiction. The section that travels concurrently with Highway11 forms part of the Trans-Canada Highway.

Route description 
The north branch travels  to the community of Kashabowie, ending at a crossing of the Canadian National Railway (CNR). The south branch begins  to the west of the north branch, and travels  to the ghost town of Burchell Lake, ending at a locked gate.
Highway11, which forms part of the Trans-Canada Highway, connects the two branches; it is listed as a concurrency with Highway802.
The north branch is also known as Kashabowie Road, while the south branch is known as Burchell Lake Road.

While the Ministry of Transportation is responsible for maintaining Highway802, the Public Transportation and Highway Improvement Act stipulates that this "does not include the clearing or removal of snow therefrom or the application of chemicals or abrasives to the icy surfaces thereof." Furthermore, the Ministry is "not liable for any damage sustained... using a tertiary road."
Traffic levels along the route are low, with approximately 40vehicles travelling the north branch and 30vehicles travelling the south branch on an average day in 2016.

History 
Highway802 follows a road that was originally built in 1901 to link the mineral exploration site at Burchell Lake with the train station at Kashabowie, along the newly-opened CNR (then the Canadian Northern Railway) tracks. The site, where copper was discovered by three prospectors in 1876, quickly grew following the opening of the new transportation link. Fluctuations in the price of copper would result in the closure of the Tip Top Mine following World War I. Interest in the site was renewed in the 1950s, and a town site constructed in 1956. The new mine began full operations extracting copper and gold in 1960, with Burchell Lake boasting a population of almost 400 at its peak.

The Department of Highways, predecessor to the modern Ministry of Transportation, having recently opened up Highway11 to Atikokan, took over the access road to the mine and to Kashabowie on April19, 1962, and designated on May24 .
However, operations at the mine were short-lived, and it closed permanently on August5, 1966. Despite this, the southern branch of the highway has remained under provincial jurisdiction.

Major intersections

References 

802
Roads in Thunder Bay District